Bajakian is a surname. Notable people with the surname include:

Aram Bajakian (born 1977), American guitarist
Clint Bajakian (born 1962), American video game composer and musician
Mike Bajakian (born 1974), American football coach

See also
Balakian

Armenian-language surnames